Senator Poston may refer to:

Bryan A. Poston (1924–2009), Louisiana State Senate
Charles M. Poston (1898–1968), Louisiana State Senate